The Women's Sabre event at the 2013 World Combat Games was held  in Saint Petersburg, Russia on 25 October.

Medalists

Athlete list

 Mennatalla Ahmed
 Alejandra Benítez
 Cécilia Berder
 Ilaria Bianco
 Yekaterina Dyachenko
 Dina Galiakbarova
 Kim Ji-yeon
 Lee Ra-jin
 Charlotte Lembach
 Ibtihaj Muhammad
 María Belén Pérez Maurice
 Aleksandra Socha
 Irene Vecchi
 Vassiliki Vougiouka
 Mariel Zagunis
 Min Zhu

Results

References
Bracket

Fencing at the 2013 World Combat Games
Combat